Jan Zygmunt Dydak (June 14, 1968 – March 27, 2019) was a Polish amateur boxer, who won the Welterweight Bronze medal at the 1988 Summer Olympics. He was born in Czeladź, Śląskie.

1988 Olympic results
Below are Dydak's boxing results at the 1988 Summer Olympics held in Seoul:

 Round of 64: bye
 Round of 32: Defeated José García (Venezuela) by decision, 4–1
 Round of 16: Defeated Humberto Aranda (Costa Rica) by decision, 4–1
 Quarterfinal: Defeated Adewale Adgebusi (Nigeria) by decision, 4–1
 Semifinal: Lost to Robert Wangila (Kenya) by walkover (was awarded bronze medal)

References

External links
 

1968 births
2019 deaths
Welterweight boxers
Boxers at the 1988 Summer Olympics
Olympic boxers of Poland
Olympic bronze medalists for Poland
People from Czeladź
Olympic medalists in boxing
Sportspeople from Silesian Voivodeship
Polish male boxers
Medalists at the 1988 Summer Olympics
20th-century Polish people
21st-century Polish people